Pete Sampras defeated Thomas Muster in the final, 6–3, 6–4 to win the singles tennis title at the 1997 Cincinnati Masters.

Andre Agassi was the two-time defending champion, but lost in the first round to Gustavo Kuerten.

Seeds 
The top eight seeds received a bye to the second round.

  Pete Sampras (champion)
  Michael Chang (semifinals)
  Goran Ivanišević (third round)
  Álex Corretja (third round)
  Thomas Muster (final)
  Sergi Bruguera (quarterfinals)
  Yevgeny Kafelnikov (quarterfinals)
  Thomas Enqvist (second round)
  Marcelo Ríos (third round)
  Gustavo Kuerten (quarterfinals)
  Mark Philippoussis (first round)
  Richard Krajicek (second round)
  Petr Korda (second round)
  Álbert Costa (semifinals)
  Tim Henman (first round)
  Patrick Rafter (third round)

Draw

Finals

Top half

Section 1

Section 2

Bottom half

Section 3

Section 4

External links
 Main draw

Singles